Baptist Ridge is an unincorporated community in Clay County, Tennessee, in the United States. It is located along State Route 292 (Baptist Ridge Road) between Standing Stone State Forest and State Route 53 (at Butlers Landing). The community largely consists of a cluster of homes and two churches nested in the mountains, almost entirely centered along State Route 292.

History
The community was named for the activities of a Baptist minister, according to local history.

References

Unincorporated communities in Clay County, Tennessee
Unincorporated communities in Tennessee